Wentworth and Dearne is a constituency represented in the House of Commons of the UK Parliament since its 2010 creation by John Healey, a member of the Labour Party.

History
Parliament accepted the Boundary Commission's Fifth Periodic Review of Westminster constituencies recommending the creation of this constituency for the 2010 general election.
Political history
Most forerunner parts of the seat of Wentworth (which only existed in its second period from 1983 until 2010) matched its record of being a safe seat for Labour. However, since the 2019 general election the seat has become a marginal between Labour and Conservative Party. Labour's majority over the Conservatives currently stands at 2,165. Labour's vote share declined by 24.7% at the 2019 election, the second worst decline in vote share it suffered in any of the 630 constituencies that the party contested at that election (only being surpassed by the 24.9% decline in the Labour vote in Bassetlaw).

Prominent frontbencher
The present member, John Healey held a continuous period of frontbench positions, withstanding during this time various rotations of the Labour frontbench – the positions were:
May 2002 – May 2005 – Economic Secretary to the Treasury
May 2005 – June 2007 – Financial Secretary to the Treasury
June 2007 – June 2009 – Minister of State for Local Government
July 2007 – June 2009 – Minister for Flood Recovery
June 2009 – May 2010 – Minister of State for Housing
May 2010 – October 2010 – Shadow Minister of State for Housing
October 2010 – October 2011 – Shadow Secretary of State for Health

In September 2015 he was appointed Shadow Minister for Housing (attending Shadow Cabinet)

Boundaries

The seat comprises satellite settlements to two large Yorkshire towns, separated by green buffers, in a band north of Rotherham and southeast of Barnsley and as such has the electoral wards:
Metropolitan Borough of Rotherham: Hoober, Rawmarsh, Silverwood, Swinton, Wath and Wickersley
Metropolitan Borough of Barnsley: Dearne North and Dearne South

Most of the constituency succeeds Wentworth however the large settlement of Dearne was instead the largest in Barnsley East and Mexborough.  The name of the seat stems from the village that shares its name with the largest private house in the country and listed gardens in the seat, Wentworth Woodhouse, in a similar manner, with a widened use of an otherwise scarcely populated settlement, as Sefton and Tatton.

Constituency profile
The South Yorkshire settlements grew in the seat into primarily large town size developments from the large presence of coal leading to extensive mining in this area, coupled with convenient proximity to Sheffield, the canals and rivers network, as well as to Doncaster, York, Wakefield and Leeds.  As the mining industry has suffered a decline and agriculture employs few people, niche manufacturing, general processing (such as of food and raw materials) as well as retail and distribution are critical sectors of the economy to local employment.  Workless claimants who were registered jobseekers were in November 2012 higher than the national average of 3.8%, at 5.6% of the population, based on a statistical compilation by The Guardian.

Members of Parliament

Elections

Elections in the 2010s

This seat was fought for the first time at the 2010 general election.

* Served as an MP in the 2005–2010 Parliament

See also
List of parliamentary constituencies in South Yorkshire

Notes

References

Parliamentary constituencies in Yorkshire and the Humber
Constituencies of the Parliament of the United Kingdom established in 2010